12 let Oktyabrya is a rural locality (a settlement) in Kargashinskoye Rural Settlement of Sasovsky District, Russia. The population was 9 .

Geography 
12 let Oktyabrya is located 11 km northwest of Sasovo (the district's administrative centre) by road. Frolovskoye is the nearest rural locality.

References 

Rural localities in Ryazan Oblast